The Open de Bretagne is an annual golf tournament held in Brittany, France and founded in 2004.

Having been a stop on the satellite Alps Tour for its first three years, in 2007 it became part of the second tier Challenge Tour schedule. It also forms part of the domestic French Tour.

Winners

Notes

External links
Coverage on the Challenge Tour's official site

Challenge Tour events
Golf tournaments in France
Recurring sporting events established in 2004
2004 establishments in France